Robeson Community College (RCC) is a public community college in Lumberton, North Carolina. As of Fall 2018, 1,671 students were enrolled at RCC. It is part of the North Carolina Community College System.

References

External links
 Official website

Universities and colleges accredited by the Southern Association of Colleges and Schools
Educational institutions established in 1965
North Carolina Community College System colleges
Education in Robeson County, North Carolina
Buildings and structures in Robeson County, North Carolina
Two-year colleges in the United States
1965 establishments in North Carolina